This is a complete list of ice hockey players who played for the Pittsburgh Pirates in the National Hockey League (NHL). It includes players that played at least one match, either in the NHL regular season or in the NHL playoffs. Granted a franchise by the NHL in 1925, the Pirates played in Pittsburgh from 1925 to 1930 and then moved to Philadelphia and became the Philadelphia Quakers. After their only season in Philadelphia, the franchise was cancelled due to financial problems. Philadelphia and Pittsburgh were each awarded an expansion team over a quarter of a century later, in 1967 (the Flyers and Penguins, respectively).



Key

  Hockey Hall of Famer, or retired number.

The "Seasons" column lists the first year of the season of the player's first game and the last year of the season of the player's last game. For example, a player who played one game in the 2000–2001 season would be listed as playing with the team from 2000–2001, regardless of what calendar year the game occurred within.

Skaters

Goaltenders

References
General
 
 

Pittsburgh Pirates